John E. Abele (born 1937) is an American businessman, and the co-founder and a director of Boston Scientific, a medical device company. He was awarded the ASME Medal in 2010. As of May 2022, his net worth was estimated at US$640 million. He was first a billionaire on the Forbes 400 list in 1996, but has since given away much of his wealth.

Biography

Early life and education
Abele was raised in a "Classic Yankee family," the youngest of three sons of Catherine (née Eaton) and Lieutenant Commander Mannert Lincoln Abele, USN. His father was the commanding officer of the submarine USS Grunion when the vessel was lost in the Aleutians on July 31, 1942, presumably to enemy action.

John and his brothers later organized, managed, and funded research to locate and photograph the Grunion – which was found in the Bering Sea – document the cause, and locate relatives of all the crew. At the age of seven, Abele was stricken with osteomyelitis, a bacterial infection of the bone, requiring multiple surgeries and years of using crutches. He is a graduate of Amherst College with a double major in physics and philosophy (he later served as a trustee).

Career
His first job was at a light-fixture company in the Midwest; he later moved back to New England to work for a small medical company near Boston. Soon after he branched out on his own and co-founded Boston Scientific with Peter Nicholas.

He was the chairman of  FIRST robotics, and served as chairman from 2002 to 2010.

Abele is a member of the USA Science and Engineering Festival's advisory board.

Personal life
Abele is married to Mary Abele. They live in Shelburne, Vermont, and have three children: Chris, Alex, and Jennifer. Chris Abele successfully ran for Milwaukee County executive in 2010.

External links
 What REALLY Happened To The USS Grunion Submarine?: John Abele at TEDxBeaconStreet 2013 
 Big Think Interview With John Abele 2012

References

1937 births
Living people
Boston Scientific people
Businesspeople from Boston
Amherst College alumni
American billionaires
20th-century American businesspeople
ASME Medal recipients
Philanthropists from Massachusetts
American company founders
Former billionaires